Mogalhat is a border railway station in Bangladesh, situated in Lalmonirhat District, in Rangpur Division. It is a defunct railway transit point on the Bangladesh-India border.

History
By the turn of the nineteenth century Lalmonirhat railway station had emerged as an important railway centre. Bengal Dooars Railway constructed a line to Malbazar. Cooch Behar State Railway constructed the Geetaldaha-Jayanti narrow gauge line. Links were established with Assam, with the Golokganj-Amingaon line coming up. In pre-independence days, a metre gauge line running via Radhikapur, Biral, Parbatipur, Tista, Gitaldaha and Golokganj connected Fakiragram in Assam with Katihar in Bihar.

The Mogalhat-Geetaldaha link was there in 1955, when Pakistan and India signed an agreement regarding resumption of rail traffic.

Note: The map below presents the position as it stands today (2020). The international border was not there when the railways were first laid in the area in the 19th-20th century. It came up in 1947. Since then, it has been an effort to live up to the new realities. The map is 'Interactive' (the larger version) - it means that all the places shown in the map are linked in the full screen map.

References

Railway stations in Lalmonirhat District
Former railway stations in Bangladesh